The Tunisian national under-18 and under-19 basketball team, nicknamed Les Aigles de Carthage (The Eagles of Carthage or The Carthage Eagles), is governed by the Tunisia Basketball Federation (FTBB). It represents the country in international under-19 and under-18 (under age 19 and under age 18) basketball competitions.

Competitive record
 Champions   Runners-up   Third place   Fourth place

Red border color indicates tournament was held on home soil.

FIBA Under-19 Basketball World Cup

FIBA Africa Under-18 Championship

 In 2004, a U20 tournament was organized, instead of U18

See also
Tunisia national basketball team
Tunisia men's national under-20 basketball team
Tunisia national under-17 basketball team
Tunisia women's national under-19 basketball team

External links
Official website of the Tunisia Basketball Federation
FIBA Profile
 Archived records of Tunisia team participations
Afrobasket – Tunisian Men National Team U18/19

References

Men's national under-19 basketball teams
Men
Basketball